Chal Siah Manchatun Jowkar (also Romanized as Chāl Sīāh Manchātūn Jowkār) is a village in Margown Rural District, Margown District, Boyer-Ahmad County, Kohgiluyeh and Boyer-Ahmad Province, Iran. At the 2006 census, its population was 46, in 9 families.

References 

Populated places in Boyer-Ahmad County